Dillberry Lake is a lake that lies on the border between Alberta and Saskatchewan. Approximately one-half of the lake lies in each province. The Alberta half also lies within Dillberry Lake Provincial Park.

Dillberry Lake
Senlac No. 411, Saskatchewan
Division No. 13, Saskatchewan
Municipal District of Wainwright No. 61